Daos can be a typical Phrygian name in Ancient Greece, and may refer to:

 A Phrygian slave character in the ancient Greek comedy Aspis (Menander) 
 A character in the Lufia video game series
Dame Alice Owen's School (DAOS), a secondary school in the United Kingdom
Détachement ALAT des opérations spéciales (DAOS), part of French Army Special Forces Command